1959 in professional wrestling describes the year's events in the world of professional wrestling.

List of notable promotions 
Only one promotion held notable shows in 1959.

Calendar of notable shows

Championship changes

EMLL

NWA

Debuts
Debut date uncertain:
Bruno Sammartino
Great Goliath
Adnan Al-Kaissie
Tony Charles
October 7 Danny Hodge

Births
Date of birth uncertain:
Super Maxx
January 1:
Steve Cox
Candi Devine(died in 2022)
January 3  Art Crews
January 15  Ken Wayne
January 19  Peggy Lee Leather
January 24  Akira Maeda
January 29  Boris Zhukov
February 3  Haku
February 4:
Ed Gantner(died in 1990)
Lawrence Taylor 
February 8  Misty Blue Simmes 
February 15  Hugo Savinovich
February 28  Rick Link 
March 2  Lola González
March 7  Sgt. Craig Pittman
March 8  Maki Ueda 
March 9  Nikita Koloff
March 16  Scott L. Schwartz
March 20  Sting
March 21  Tony Stetson 
March 24  Barry Horowitz
March 29  Michael Hayes
April 4  Jeannie Clark
April 14  Jesse Barr
April 16  Gran Apache(died in 2017)
April 18  Debbie Combs
April 27  Mad Maxine
May 1   Scott McGhee
May 19  Vicky Carranza
May 21  Sean Mooney
June 11  Magnum T. A.
June 13  Danny Fargo (died in 2003) 
June 14  Buzz Sawyer(died in 1992)
June 16  The Ultimate Warrior(died in 2014)
June 18  Johnny Lee Clary (died in 2014) 
June 30  Víctor Quiñones(died in 2006)
July 6  El Torero
July 8  Don Nakaya Nielsen (died in 2017) 
July 9  Kevin Nash
July 10: 
Duane Gill
Eric Embry
July 15  Ranger Ross
July 17:
DJ Peterson(died in 1993)
Randy Anderson(died in 2002)
July 31  Jason the Terrible
August 13  Danny Bonaduce
August 16  Dennis Koslowski 
August 18  Tom Prichard
August 19  Tim Horner
September 23  Hans Nijman (died in 2014) 
October 6  Barry Darsow
October 7  Brazo de Oro(died in 2017)
October 18:
Nord the Barbarian
 Carlos Cabrera 
October 21  John Tatum
October 24  Dave Meltzer
November 6  Máscara Sagrada
November 9  Nick Patrick
November 11  Van Hammer 
November 21  Jerry Flynn
December 11  Doug Furnas(died in 2012)
December 13  Ricky Lawless (died in 1988) 
December 24  Ángel Mortal

Deaths
November 7 - Victor McLaglen, 72 
November 21 - Max Baer (boxer), 50

References

 
professional wrestling